De Agostini is an Italian publishing house. The name may also refer to:

 De Agostini (surname), Italian surname
 Alberto de Agostini National Park, Chilean natural park

See also 

 Agostini (disambiguation)